Winnie the Pooh and Christmas Too is a 1991 Christmas television special based on the Disney television series The New Adventures of Winnie the Pooh, originally broadcast on December 14, 1991, on ABC and produced by Walt Disney Animation (France), S.A. and Walt Disney Television Animation.

The special received a primetime Emmy Award nomination for Outstanding Children's Program in 1992.

Plot
Two days before Christmas, Christopher Robin writes out a letter to Santa Claus for him and his friends in the Hundred Acre Wood, asking for presents; Rabbit wants a new fly swatter to stop bugs from eating carrots; Eeyore wants an umbrella to keep the snow off his house; Tigger wants a snowshoe for his tail so he can bounce on the snow without his hands and feet; Christopher Robin wants a sled "big enough for him and maybe a friend or two"; and Piglet says that Santa Claus can bring him anything.

He sends the letter off into the wind, but on Christmas Eve, Winnie the Pooh realizes, after Piglet informs him, that he did not ask anything for himself, so they search for the letter, which has not gotten very far. Afterwards, they, along with Tigger and Eeyore, go to Rabbit's house and rewrite the letter to include Pooh's present, a pot of honey. Along the way, however, they become greedy and start upgrading their desires.

Following this, Tigger, Eeyore, and Rabbit go off to get a giant Christmas tree, with help from a reluctant Gopher. Meanwhile, Pooh and Piglet go back to the point where Robin sent the letter and cast it off into the wind again. But the wind shifts southward, and the letter follows Pooh to his house. He goes to Piglet and informs him of what happened. Knowing that the rest of the gang will not get their presents as a result of this, Pooh tells Piglet they must take it into their hands to make sure the gifts are delivered.

Pooh (disguised as Santa) sneaks out and delivers Tigger, Rabbit, and Eeyore a super-bouncer barrel, a bug sprayer made from a teapot, and a mobile home made from a suitcase, respectively - or rather, handmade versions of the said items that break apart upon use. Demanding to know what is going on, the three of them corner Pooh, who says that he is Santa. However, Piglet, disguised as a "sorry-lookin' reindeer", slips and makes his sled fall downhill before crashing, exposing Pooh's disguise.

After explaining what happened, Pooh decides to try to deliver the letter to Santa himself, telling the rest of the gang it would be worth missing Christmas if he could "bring Christmas" to them. He does not get far, though, as the wind suddenly takes the letter, so he gives up. At the Christmas tree, Pooh's friends bemoan that spending time with him at Christmas is more important than getting gifts just as Pooh reunites with them. Robin shows up on his new sled and brings them the gifts they had originally asked for. Even though Pooh doesn't feel like he deserves his gift due to his failure to deliver their letter, he gives Christopher Robin a hug after he urges Pooh to accept his gift as they celebrate Christmas.

Cast
 Jim Cummings as Winnie the Pooh
 Paul Winchell as Tigger
 Ken Sansom as Rabbit
 John Fiedler as Piglet
 Peter Cullen as Eeyore
 Michael Gough as Gopher
 Edan Gross as Christopher Robin
 Patricia Parris as Christopher Robin's Mother (footage)

Broadcast history
When Winnie the Pooh and Christmas Too originally aired, it was introduced by way of a short introductory skit featuring Michael Eisner and the Disneyland walk-around versions of the Winnie the Pooh characters. The special was then accompanied by the Donald Duck cartoons The Hockey Champ and Bearly Asleep, as well as a promo for Beauty and the Beast. also as The special was then accompanied by promo for Walt Disney Fairy Tales and The Making of The Muppet Christmas Carol The first airing of the special ranked 53rd out of 92 shows that week, averaging a 10.8/20 rating/share, ranking second place in its first half hour behind The Golden Girls and first place in its second half hour ahead of Walter and Emily.

The special was first released on VHS on November 25, 1994. The VHS was re-released in 1997, with a sneak peek at Recess before the special. Also, it was later partnered with Mickey's Christmas Carol. It was originally broadcast on ABC. The special was broadcast on CBS in 1995. After Disney's purchase of ABC, that network once again became the home of all subsequent broadcasts. It re-aired on ABC in 1998 and kept on air until 1999. It returned for the first time on December 11, 2007, but immediately edited down. The edited 2007 version aired on ABC Family (now Freeform), as part of their "25 Days of Christmas" as of December 2008.

Currently, the only DVD release available is the direct-to-video release Winnie the Pooh: A Very Merry Pooh Year, where it is edited into the main feature. However, Christopher Robin's lines are re-dubbed by his voice actor in the film's main story, and Rabbit's animation is recolored to have him in his usual yellow-furred appearance (as opposed to his greenish fur in the New Adventures series). This is also the only presentation of the special on Disney+.

Reception
In 2004, TV Guide ranked the special number four on its 10 Best Classic Family Holiday Shows list.

See also
 List of Christmas films

References

External links

 
 

1991 television specials
Christmas television specials
Disney television specials
Winnie-the-Pooh specials
American Broadcasting Company television specials
Winnie the Pooh (franchise)
1980s American animated films
1990s American animated films
American Christmas films
1990s American television specials
1990s animated television specials
Television specials by Disney Television Animation
American Christmas television specials
1990s children's animated films
Animated Christmas television specials
1990s English-language films
Films directed by Jamie Mitchell (director)
1980s English-language films